Hoklo Taiwanese or Holo people are a major ethnic group in Taiwan whose ancestry is wholly or partially Hoklo. Being Taiwanese of Han origin, their mother tongue is Taiwanese (Tâi-oân-ōe) (Tâi-gí), also known as Taiwanese Hokkien. Due to The Republic of China's national language policy, most are also fluent in Taiwanese Mandarin. Most descend from the Hoklo people of Quanzhou or Zhangzhou in Southern Fujian, China. The term, as commonly understood, signifies those whose ancestors immigrated to Taiwan before 1949. However, most Hoklo Taiwanese did not distance themselves from Taiwanese identity and prefer to call themselves Taiwanese only, since most of them didn't associate themselves with terms like Hokkien, Southern Min (Minnan) or Hoklo. Some Taiwanese optionally identified as Southern Min (Minnan) as well.

See also
Hoklo people
Hoklo Americans
Taiwanese people
Taiwanese Americans
Hakka Taiwanese
Han Taiwanese
Vietnamese people in Taiwan

References

External links

 
People of Hokkien descent